Hüseyinli may refer to:

Hüseyinli, Alaplı, a village in Zonguldak Province, Turkey
Hüseyinli, Sincik, a village in Adıyaman Province, Turkey